Locusts and Wild Honey is a 1980 Australian mini series about a small town where they spot UFOs.

Cast
The series starred Julia Blake and her two real-life daughters, Jane and Sarah Norris, as her on-screen daughters who are abducted by aliens.

Frank Gallacher – Jan
Beverly Blankenship – Anna
Jane Norris – Nikki
Sarah Norris – Tassy
Tim Robertson – Reverend Charles
Julia Blake – Dr. Fletcher

References

External links
Locusts and Wild Honey at IMDb
Locusts and Wild Honey at AustLit

1980s Australian television miniseries
1980 Australian television series debuts
1980 Australian television series endings
1980 television films
1980 films
English-language television shows
Australian action adventure films
Australian Broadcasting Corporation original programming
Films directed by Douglas Sharp